Mobile advertising is a form of advertising via mobile (wireless) phones or other mobile devices. It is a subset of mobile marketing, mobile advertising can take place as text ads via SMS, or banner advertisements that appear embedded in a mobile web site.

It is estimated that U.S. mobile app-installed ads accounted for 30% of all mobile advertising revenue in 2014, and will top $4.6 billion in 2016, and over $6.8 billion by the end of 2019. Other ways mobile advertising can be purchased include working with a Mobile Demand Side Platform, in which ad impressions are bought in real-time on an Ad exchange. Another report has indicated that worldwide mobile digital advertising spend would reach $185 billion in 2018, $217 billion in 2019 and $247 billion in 2020.

Overview 
Some see mobile advertising as closely related to online or internet advertising, though its reach is far greater — currently, most mobile advertising is targeted at mobile phones, that came at an estimated global total of $4.6 billion as of 2009. Notably computers, including desktops and laptops, are currently estimated at 1.1 billion globally. Moreover, mobile advertising includes SMS and MMS advertising units in addition to the advertisement types served and processed via online channels.

It is probable that advertisers and media industry will increasingly take account of a bigger and fast-growing mobile market, though it remains at around 1% of global advertising spend. Mobile media is evolving rapidly and while mobile phones will continue to be the mainstay, it is not clear whether mobile phones based on cellular backhaul or smartphones based on WiFi hot spot or WiMAX hot zone will also strengthen. However, such is the emergence of this form of advertising, that there is now a dedicated global awards ceremony organized every year by Visiongain.

According to the research firm Berg Insight the global mobile advertising market that was estimated to €1 billion in 2008. Furthermore, Berg Insight forecasts the global mobile advertising market to grow at a compound annual growth rate of 43 percent to €8.7 billion in 2014. eMarketer reported, that nearly $101 billion was spent on mobile ads in 2020.

Types of mobile ads
 Click-to-download ads: the user will be directed to the App store or Google Play
 Click-to-call ads: the user will call to a phone number after clicking the button.
 Click-to-message ads: the user will be directed to an SMS application to message the advertiser.
 Image text and banner ads: a click opens your browser and re-directs you to a page
 Push notification
 Pin pull ads: mostly common in Playrix ads

Mobile rich media 
There are limitations to rich media on mobile because all of the coding must be done in HTML5, since iOS does not support flash.

Handsets display and corresponding ad images
There are hundreds of handsets in the market and they differ by screen size and supported technologies (e.g. MMS, WAP 2.0). For color images, formats such as PNG, JPEG, GIF and BMP are typically supported, along with the monochrome WBMP format. The following gives an overview of various handset screen sizes and a recommended image size for each type.

Source: Mobile Marketing Association

History

Martin Cooper invented a portable handset in 1973, when he was a project manager at Motorola. It was almost three decades after the idea of cellular communications was introduced by Bell Laboratories. Two decades later, cellular phones made a commercial debut in the mass market in the early 1990s. In the early days of cellular handsets, phone functionality was limited to dialing, and voice input/output.

When the second generation of mobile telecoms (so-called 2G) was introduced in Finland by Radiolinja (now Elisa) on the GSM standard (now the world's most common mobile technology with over 2 billion users) in 1991, the digital technology introduced data services. SMS text messaging was the first such service. The first person-to-person SMS text message was sent in Finland in December 1994. SMS (Short Message Service) gradually began to grow, becoming the largest data service by number of users in the world, currently with 74% of all mobile subscribers or 2.4 billion people active users of SMS in 2007.

One advantage of SMS is that while even in conference, users are able to send and receive brief messages unobtrusively, while enjoying privacy. Even in such environments as in a restaurant, café, bank, travel agency office, and so on, the users can enjoy some privacy by sending/receiving brief text messages in an unobtrusive way.

It would take six years from the launch of SMS until the first case of advertising would appear on this new data media channel, when a Finnish news provider offered free news headlines via SMS, sponsored by advertising. This led to rapid experimentation in mobile advertising and mobile marketing, and the world's first conference to discuss mobile advertising was held in London in 2000, sponsored by the Wireless Marketing Association (which later merged into the Mobile Marketing Association). The first books to discuss mobile advertising were Ahonen's M-Profits and Haig's Mobile Marketing in 2002. Several major mobile operators around the world launched their own mobile advertising arms, like Aircross in South Korea, owned by the parents of SK Telecoms the biggest mobile operator, or like D2 Communications in Japan, the joint venture of Japan's largest mobile operator NTT DoCoMo and Dentsu, Japan's largest ad agency.

Mobile as media

This unobtrusive three-way communications caught the attention of media industry and advertisers as well as cellphone makers and telecom operators. Usually, Text SMS became a new media – called the “third mass media channel” by several media and mobile experts – and even more, it is a two-way mobile media, as opposed to either mobile or any other media like radios, newspapers and TV.  Besides, the immediacy of responsiveness in this two-way media is a new territory found for media industry and advertisers, who are eager to measure up market response immediately. Additionally, the possibility of fast delivery of the messages and the ubiquity of the technology (it does not require any additional functionality from the mobile phone, all devices available today are capable of receiving SMS), make it ideal for time- and location-sensitive advertising, such as customer loyalty offers (ex. shopping centers, large brand stores), SMS promotions of events, etc. To leverage this strength of SMS advertising, timely and reliable delivery of messages is paramount, which is guaranteed by some SMS gateway providers.

Mobile media has begun to draw more significant attention from the media advertising industry since the mid-2000-2001-s, based on a view that mobile media was to change the way advertisements were made, and that mobile devices can form a new media sector. Despite this, revenues are still a small fraction of the advertising industry as a whole but are most certainly on the rise. Informa reported that mobile advertising in 2007 was worth $2.2 billion, which is less than 0.5% of the approximately $450 billion global advertising industry.

Types of mobile advertising are expected to change rapidly or immediately as the case may be. In other words, mobile technology will come up with a strong push for identifying newer and unheard-of mobile multimedia, with the result that subsequent media migration will greatly stimulate a consumer behavioral shift and establish a paradigm shift in mobile advertising. A major media migration is on, as desktop Internet evolves into mobile Internet. One typical case in point is Nielsen’s buyout of Telephia.

The rapid change in the technology used by mobile advertisers can also have adverse effect to the number of consumers being reached by the mobile advertisements, Telephia. due to technical limitations of their mobile devices. Because of that, campaigns that aim to achieve wide response or are targeting lower income groups might be better of relying on older, more widespread mobile media advertising technologies, such as SMS or any other mode of communication.

Viral marketing

As mobile is an interactive mass media similar to the internet, advertisers are eager to utilize and make use of viral marketing methods, by which one recipient of an advertisement on mobile, will forward that to a friend. This allows users to become part of the advertising experience. At the bare minimum mobile ads with viral abilities can become powerful interactive campaigns. At the extreme, they can become engagement marketing experiences. A key element of mobile marketing campaigns is the most influential member of any target audience or community, which is called the alpha user.

Privacy concern 
Advocates have raised the issue of privacy.  Targeted mobile marketing requires customization of ad content to reach interested and relevant customers. To customize such behavioral personal data, user profiling, data mining and other behavior watch tools are employed, and privacy advocates warn that this may cause privacy infringement.

References

External links 
 Association of National Advertisers
 “Letting Consumers Control Marketing: Priceless”

Advertising
Advertising by medium
Promotion and marketing communications
Mobile phones